Jato Nunatak is a small but distinctive nunatak at the northern end of Barker Range, in Victoria Land, Antarctica. It was named by the southern party of the New Zealand Federated Mountain Clubs Antarctic Expedition, 1962–63, after the JATO bottles used by American aircraft to assist in taking off with heavy loads at high elevations. The aircraft landing point was nearby.

References

Nunataks of Victoria Land
Borchgrevink Coast